Cubberley may refer to:

Cubberley Community Center, community center in Palo Alto, California
David Cubberley, Canadian politician
Ellwood Patterson Cubberley (1868–1941), American educator and author
Elijah Cubberley Hutchinson (1855–1932), American Republican Party politician, New Jersey
Ellwood P. Cubberley High School, one of three public high schools in Palo Alto California

See also
Coberley
Cubley (disambiguation)
Kaberle